Robert Fraser was a Scottish professional football defender who played for Albion Rovers and Aberdeen.

Fraser joined Aberdeen in 1931, and was appointed team captain in 1934. He emigrated to South Africa in 1938, a year after visiting the country on the club's summer tour.

At representative level, he took part in a Scottish Football Association tour of North America in the summer of 1935, but none of the fixtures was a full international.

References

Footballers from Motherwell
Association football defenders
Scottish footballers
Albion Rovers F.C. players
Aberdeen F.C. players
Scottish Football League players
Scottish emigrants to South Africa
Year of birth missing